Harold Varner III (born August 15, 1990) is an American professional golfer who has played on the PGA Tour. He won the Australian PGA Championship in December 2016 and the PIF Saudi International in February 2022.

Amateur career
Varner was born in Akron, Ohio, but raised in Gastonia, North Carolina where he played golf at Forestview High School. He played his collegiate golf at East Carolina University and was the first player in school history to be named Conference USA player of the year. He also competed in the 2010 U.S. Amateur at Chambers Bay in University Place, Washington.

Professional career
Varner turned professional in 2012, missing the cut at the Chiquita Classic. Prior to playing on the Web.com Tour, he played on the eGolf Tour and Florida Tour. He qualified for the 2013 U.S. Open, but missed the cut.

Varner started playing on the Web.com Tour in 2014, making 13 cuts in 21 tournaments with two top-10 finishes. His best finish was T-2 at the Rex Hospital Open. He finished 30th on the money list in his first full season. He also played in two PGA Tour events, the Northern Trust Open (T70) and Wells Fargo Championship (missed cut).

In 2015, he had five top-25 finishes and a runner-up finish at the Panama Claro Championship. He finished 25th on the Web.com Tour regular season money list, the last guaranteed spot, to earn a PGA Tour card for the 2015–16 season. Varner is the first African American golfer to advance to the PGA Tour via the Web.com Tour.

In December 2016, Varner earned his first professional golf victory by winning the Australian PGA Championship, a tournament co-sanctioned by the PGA Tour of Australasia and the European Tour. He is only the second American to win the Australian PGA Championship and the first since Hale Irwin won it in 1978. He also became the third black man to win on the European Tour after Vincent Tshabalala of South Africa and Tiger Woods.

In May 2019, Varner was tied for second heading into the final round of the PGA Championship on Bethpage Black outside of New York City. He played in the final group with eventual champion Brooks Koepka but shot 81 to finish tied for 36th.

In April 2021, Varner recorded his best finish to date on the PGA Tour. A tied-second place at the RBC Heritage; four shots behind Stewart Cink.

In February 2022, Varner won the PIF Saudi International on the Asian Tour. He eagled the final hole with a 92 foot putt to beat Bubba Watson by one shot.

In April 2022, Varner held his first solo 54-hole PGA Tour lead at the RBC Heritage. He finished tied for third, one shot behind winner Jordan Spieth. He moved to a career high 36th in the world rankings. In May 2022 at the Charles Schwab Challenge, Varner was tied for the lead after the 11th hole in the final round. He finished the round 9 shots back of the eventual winner after closing at +10 over the final seven holes. In August 2022, it was announced that Varner had joined LIV Golf.

Professional wins (2)

European Tour wins (1)

1Co-sanctioned by the PGA Tour of Australasia

European Tour playoff record (0–1)

Asian Tour wins (1)

Results in major championships
Results not in chronological order in 2020.

CUT = missed the half-way cut
"T" = tied
NT = No tournament due to COVID-19 pandemic

Summary

Most consecutive cuts made – 3 (2019 PGA – 2021 PGA)
Longest streak of top-10s – 0

Results in The Players Championship

CUT = missed the halfway cut
"T" indicates a tie for a place
C = Canceled after the first round due to the COVID-19 pandemic

Results in World Golf Championships

1Cancelled due to COVID-19 pandemic

"T" = Tied
NT = No tournament
Note that the Championship and Invitational were discontinued from 2022.

See also
2015 Web.com Tour Finals graduates

References

External links

American male golfers
African-American golfers
PGA Tour golfers
LIV Golf players
Korn Ferry Tour graduates
Golfers from Ohio
Golfers from Charlotte, North Carolina
East Carolina University alumni
Sportspeople from Akron, Ohio
1990 births
Living people
21st-century African-American sportspeople